Anastasiia Andriyivna Chetverikova (born 1998) is a Ukrainian sprint canoeist. She competed at the 2020 Summer Olympics, winning a silver medal in the women's C-2 500 metres.

She won her first senior international medal at the 2019 ICF Canoe Sprint World Championships.

References

External links

1998 births
Living people
ICF Canoe Sprint World Championships medalists in Canadian
Ukrainian female canoeists
European Games competitors for Ukraine
Canoeists at the 2019 European Games
Olympic canoeists of Ukraine
Canoeists at the 2020 Summer Olympics
Medalists at the 2020 Summer Olympics
Olympic silver medalists for Ukraine
Olympic medalists in canoeing
Sportspeople from Kherson
21st-century Ukrainian women